The Satellite Award for Best Documentary Film is an annual award given by the International Press Academy.

Winners and nominees

1990s

2000s

2010s

2020s

Multiple wins
Asif Kapadia-2 (one tied with Joshua Oppenheimer)
Jeff Orlowski-2

See also
Academy Award for Best Documentary Feature
Independent Spirit Award for Best Documentary Feature

References

External links
 Official website

Documentary Film
American documentary film awards
Awards established in 1997